Sain (also Romanized as Sā’īn and Soin) is a village in Yurchi-ye Sharqi Rural District, Kuraim District, Nir County, Ardabil Province, Iran. At the 2006 census, its population was 287, in 50 families.

References 

Tageo

Towns and villages in Nir County